Ruddell General Store, also known as the Country Store Museum, is a historic general store building located at Glenville, Gilmer County, West Virginia. It was built in 1890, and is a two-story, two bay, commercial building measuring 30 feet by 65 feet.  The first story storefront is original material and design.  It was occupied by a retail store until the 1970s, after which it was acquired by the West Virginia State Folk Festival, Inc., and open as the Country Store Museum.

It was listed on the National Register of Historic Places in 1998.

References

External links
 Country Store and Museum - West Virginia Folk Festival

Museums in Gilmer County, West Virginia
Commercial buildings on the National Register of Historic Places in West Virginia
Commercial buildings completed in 1890
Buildings and structures in Gilmer County, West Virginia
Buildings designated early commercial in the National Register of Historic Places in West Virginia
National Register of Historic Places in Gilmer County, West Virginia
History museums in West Virginia
1890 establishments in West Virginia
General stores in the United States